The Felipe Trigo Awards are annual literary honors created in 1981 on the initiative of the City Council of Villanueva de la Serena, Spain. On 24 November 1980, the Municipal Assembly agreed to institute it as a tribute to the writer Felipe Trigo, born in the city in 1864.

It is given in two categories: Novel and Short Narrative. A third, Short Narrative by Extremaduran Author, was added in the award's 2nd edition, but then discontinued in its 8th edition in 1988.

The economic endowment of the Felipe Trigo Award is currently €6,000 for Short Narrative (originally 200,000 pesetas) and €20,000 for Novel (originally 400,000 pesetas). It is granted in December, and the winning works are published by Editorial Algaida.

In August 2001, the Government of Extremadura removed the subsidy that had been given to the award. In spite of this, Villanueva de la Serena's councilor of the Felipe Trigo Award, María Lozano, affirmed that it would continue to be given.

Winning novels

Winning short narratives

References

1981 establishments in Spain
Awards established in 1981
Spanish literary awards